Fred Saidy (February 11, 1907 – May 14, 1982) was an American playwright and screenwriter.

Biography 
Born in Los Angeles, California, Saidy began his writing career in 1943 with the screenplay for the Red Skelton comedy I Dood It. The following year, he scripted both the Lucille Ball-Dick Powell feature film Meet the People and the book for the Harold Arlen-E. Y. Harburg musical Bloomer Girl. It was the first of several collaborations with Harburg, which included Finian's Rainbow (1947), Flahooley (1951), Jamaica (1957), and The Happiest Girl in the World (1961). He was nominated for the Tony Award for Best Musical for Jamaica.

Finian's Rainbow has had three major revivals (1955, 1960 and 1967), and was also made into a film starring Fred Astaire and Petula Clark, directed by Francis Ford Coppola, in 1968. Saidy's last project was the screenplay for the film, for which he was nominated for the Writers Guild of America Award for Best Written American Musical. In 2004 the Irish Repertory Theatre staged a well-received Off-Broadway production. New York's City Center Encores! series performed a critically acclaimed concert version of the piece in March 2009. Directed and choreographed by Warren Carlyle, it starred Tony Award-winner Jim Norton and Kate Baldwin as Finian and Sharon, with Cheyenne Jackson as Woody and Jeremy Bobb as Og, the leprechaun. A Broadway revival will begin on October 8, 2009, with opening scheduled for October 29 at the St. James Theatre with most of the Encores! cast. Newly added to the Broadway cast are Christopher Fitzgerald as Og and Chuck Cooper as Billboard; Jim Norton, Kate Baldwin and Cheyenne Jackson all reprise their roles

Saidy collaborated with Neil Simon and Will Glickman, among others, on Satins and Spurs, an original television musical for Betty Hutton, which was broadcast by NBC in September 1954.

Personal life 
Saidy is the father of the international chess master Anthony Saidy.

External links

American male screenwriters
Writers from Los Angeles
1907 births
1982 deaths
20th-century American dramatists and playwrights
American people of Lebanese descent
Place of death missing
American male dramatists and playwrights
20th-century American male writers
Screenwriters from California
20th-century American screenwriters